Akulovskaya is a rural locality (a village) in Spasskoye Rural Settlement, Tarnogsky District, Vologda Oblast, Russia. The population was 19 as of 2002.

Geography 
Akulovskaya is located 28 km northwest of Tarnogsky Gorodok (the district's administrative centre) by road. Borok is the nearest rural locality.

References 

Rural localities in Tarnogsky District